Giacinto Gilioli (1594- 27 June 1665) was an Italian painter of the baroque period, active mainly in Bologna. He trained with the Caracci brothers. He collaborated with the Flemish painters Willem Drost, van Terlee & Willem de Poorter.

References

Italian Baroque painters
17th-century Italian painters
Italian male painters
Painters from Bologna
1665 deaths
1594 births